Galt Field is a small, privately-owned, public-use airport located in McHenry County, Illinois, United States. It is located about 1 mile (1.6 km) north of the village of Wonder Lake, Illinois.

Facilities and aircraft 
The airport has two runways: Runway 9/27, which is 2802 x 36 ft (854 x 11 m) and made of asphalt, and Runway 18/36, which is 2141 x 125 ft (653 x 38 m) and made of turf. The airport primarily serves general aviation, and for the 12-month period ending May 31, 2019, the airport averaged 110 operations per day, or about 40,150 per year. There were 32 aircraft based on the airport during that period, which included 30 single-engine and 2 multi-engine airplanes.

The airport is also home to EAA Chapter 932, and it offers a variety of services to its tenants. The airport features an aircraft maintenance shop, hosts ground-school classes for prospective pilots, and offers a fishing pond and fire pit for hangar tenant use.

Accidents and incidents 

 On November 25, 2022, an EA-300LC piloted by the owner of Galt Field crashed a quarter mile east of the airport against a tree, off the departure end of runway 9. As of February 2023, an investigation into the cause of the crash is ongoing.

References 

Airports in Illinois
Buildings and structures in Henry County, Illinois
Transportation in Henry County, Illinois